Dry running protection, also known as dry-run protection or dry-running protection, is a type of protection mechanism to prevent a rotor, pump or stirrer shaft from operating without any medium added, as the bearing and shaft seal might be damaged if the motor is run while dry. 
Dry-running protection is one of the most important monitoring functions, as bearings and shaft seal may be damaged if the booster pumps run dry. It is thus always recommended to install dry-running protection on all booster sets.

There are three different methods for detection of water shortage:
Pressure switch on suction manifold or float switch/electrode relay in the supply tank: Dry-running protection with pressure/level switch.
 
Measurement of inlet pressure in the suction manifold by means of an analogue pressure transmitter: Dry-running protection with pressure transmitter.
 
Measurement of level in the supply tank by means of an analogue level transmitter: Dry-running protection with level transmitter.
</ref>

References

Pumps